Harry Franklin "Hal" Price (June 24, 1886 – April 15, 1964) was an American film and stage actor. He appeared in more than 260 films between 1930 and 1952. He is the father of character actress and comedian Lu Leonard. 

On stage, Price toured for three months with Will Rogers in a production of Ah, Wilderness!. He also performed with Leo Carillo and William Gillette. He had the role of Willem in the Broadway production of The Red Mill (1945).

Personal life
Price was born in Wauseon, Ohio, and died in Los Angeles, California, from arteriosclerosis. His daughter Mary Lou was an actress, known as Lu Leonard.

Partial filmography

 Night Ride (1930)
 See America Thirst (1930)
 The Lawyer's Secret (1931)
 The Last Man (1932)
 Sin's Pay Day (1932)
 The Widow in Scarlet (1932)
 Lady and Gent (1932)
 This Sporting Age (1932)
 Vanity Street (1932)
 The Final Edition (1932)
 Ride Him, Cowboy (1932)
 Breed of the Border (1933)
 Galloping Romeo (1933)
 Riders of Destiny (1933)
 Sagebrush Trail (1933)
 Hell Bent for Love (1934)
 One in a Million (1934)
 Westward Ho (1935)
 Sea Spoilers (1936)
 The Fugitive Sheriff (1936)
 Born to Fight (1936)
 Melody of the Plains (1937)
 Valley of Terror (1937)
 Where Trails Divide (1937)
 Pioneer Trail (1938)
 Call the Mesquiteers (1938)
 Across the Plains (1939)
 The Night Riders (1939)
 Man from Texas (1939)
 Overland Mail (1939)
 New Frontier (1939)
 Billy the Kid Outlawed (1940)
 Lone Star Raiders (1940)
 Frontier Crusader (1940)
 Gangs of Sonora (1941)
 The Lone Rider Ambushed (1941)
 Billy the Kid in Santa Fe (1941)
 Raiders of the Range (1942)
 War Dogs (1942)
 Sheriff of Sage Valley (1942)
 The Blocked Trail (1943)
 Two Fisted Justice (1943)
 Fugitive of the Plains (1943)
 Western Cyclone (1943)
 Law Men (1944)
Fuzzy Settles Down (1944)
 Harmony Trail (1944)
 Wild Horse Phantom (1944)
 Oath of Vengeance (1944)
 Rustlers' Hideout (1944)
 The Lone Ranger (1950 TV episode #21)

References

External links
 
 

1886 births
1964 deaths
Male actors from Ohio
American male film actors
20th-century American male actors
Deaths from arteriosclerosis
People from Wauseon, Ohio
American male stage actors